Bavi may refer to:

Bavi County, an administrative subdivision of Iran
Karim Bavi, footballer
Tropical Storm Bavi (disambiguation), multiple storms
Bounty Agro Ventures, Inc., a Philippine poultry company